Renne Hughes (August 18, 1941 – October 30, 1991) born in Lamesa, Texas was an American painter and photographer who became known for his depictions of the American West. Renne won awards and achievements across the U.S. and abroad and in 1978 he was officially awarded the Texas State Artist title. By the mid 1980s his fan base and body of work caught the attention of Zsa Zsa Gabor and President Ronald Reagan, who famously acquired his artwork on an issue of the Fort Worth Star-Telegram.

Early life
Renne was born to Jack B. Hughes and Mabel Dean Sasser in 1941. His father was a record holder athlete at the University of Texas in Austin and was a discus contender in the 1940 Summer Olympics before they were cancelled due to World War II. He spent his childhood in the Texas country and began to create drawings, sketches and began working with oil paints. The family later moved to Lake Worth, Texas where he eventually attended Arlington Heights high school and was a champion body builder at LCRA. He later attended Texas Christian University for an engineering degree where he met his wife, Laura Shesa.

Career
His first work sold was at Forest Park, Texas art show and was a 24x36 autumn scene for $25.00. He began selling sets of paintings called "four seasons' and began going to art fairs from Cheyenne, Wyoming to Goshen (town), New York to anywhere in the south. His passion for the old west and talent for painting it soon took over.

His passion for the Old West and Texan Heritage led him to photography sessions at the Y.O. Ranch cattle drives, old abandoned ranches and homes in the Texas Hill Country and historical re-enactments. Soon after that his interest spread to native American cultures where he would spend a lot of time photographing and talking to Native American Indians at their reservations.  He soon began to grace magazine covers such as The Cattleman and local newspapers with his stories and artwork. Renne also donated numbers of original works to charitable donations including the Annual Cowboys Charity at Texas Stadium and he painted the Leukemia Poster Child among others.

Renne became famous for his many depictions of life in the American West and lived on the edge of a quickly evolving society. His mission and passion was to capture images and recreate the era of the western United States where the inroads of civilization had ended the frontier lifestyle. His craving for history then led him to attend and re-enactment many civil war battles, the Battle of the Alamo, the Texas Sesquicentennial and live the old west. He was best in show twice at Littleton, Colorado and many times at Southwestern Exposition and Livestock Show (Fort Worth Stock Show) among other awards.

Last work
His last work was finished the day before he died and was of the famous battle of Texas, The Battle of the Alamo. The work, "Texas: The Moment of Birth" (1991), was printed in limited edition by his close friend, Dr. William C. Anderson. He painted himself wounded in the bottom right corner.

Gallery
www.rennehughes.org

Notes

www.rennehughes.org

20th-century American photographers
20th-century American painters
American male painters
Artists from Texas
1941 births
1991 deaths
20th-century American male artists